Anatoly Petrovich Guzhvin (March 25, 1946 – August 17, 2004) was a Russian politician and governor of Astrakhan Oblast.

Career
Between 1988 and the breakup of the Soviet Union, Guzhvin was a regional deputy in the Soviet Supreme Council. He assumed the governorship of the Astrakhan Oblast region in 1991, and re-elected on December 11, 1996. He was a member of the United Russia party.

Death
He died of a heart attack aged 58 while holidaying in the resort town of Sochi on the Black Sea.

References

1946 births
2004 deaths
People from Akhtubinsky District
Governors of Astrakhan Oblast
Heads of the federal subjects of Russia who died in office
Members of the Federation Council of Russia (1996–2000)
Our Home – Russia politicians
United Russia politicians
21st-century Russian politicians